William Mordeno (1947/1948 – January 30, 2022) was a Filipino sprinter.

Biography
One of the top-sprinters in the Philippines in the 1960s, he competed at the 1966 Asian Games where he won a bronze in the men's 4 × 100 metres relay with Rogelio Onofre, Remegio Vista, and Arnulfo Valles under coach Ruperto Evangelista. He is also known for competing in the 100 metre sprint, ranking behind Onofre and Valles at his peak.

He retired in the 1970s, to work as a provincial sports regulation officer in Agusan del Sur until 2010. He was among the casualties of the COVID-19 pandemic, dying on January 30, 2022, in Butuan of complications from COVID-19 at age 74.

References

External links
 

1940s births
Year of birth uncertain
2022 deaths
Deaths from the COVID-19 pandemic in the Philippines
Filipino male sprinters
Place of birth missing
Asian Games medalists in athletics (track and field)
Asian Games bronze medalists for the Philippines
Athletes (track and field) at the 1966 Asian Games
Medalists at the 1966 Asian Games